Erik Førner (born 24 September 1963, Bærum) is a Norwegian diplomat.

He was born in Oslo and is a cand.oecon. by education. He started working for the Norwegian Ministry of Foreign Affairs in 1991. He became subdirector in 2003 and head of department in 2004, before embarking on a counsellor position at the Norwegian embassy in Sweden from 2006 to 2011. He served as the Norwegian ambassador to the Philippines from 2014 and 2018 and to Switzerland from 2018 to 2022.

Foreign honours
:
 Grand Cross (Datu) of the Order of Sikatuna (GrCS) (13 June 2018)

References

1963 births
Living people
Diplomats from Oslo
Norwegian expatriates in Sweden
Ambassadors of Norway to the Philippines
Ambassadors of Norway to Switzerland